Linda Faber (born 29 February 1960 in Veenendaal, Utrecht) is a former freestyle  swimmer from the Netherlands who competed for her native country at the 1976 Summer Olympics in Montreal, Quebec, Canada. She was eliminated in the preliminaries for 400m freestyle. As part of the freestyle team, she came 4th in the 4 × 100 m relay, with Enith Brigitha, Ineke Ran and Annelies Maas.

References

1960 births
Living people
Dutch female freestyle swimmers
Olympic swimmers of the Netherlands
Swimmers at the 1976 Summer Olympics
People from Veenendaal
Sportspeople from Utrecht (province)
20th-century Dutch women